The 2002–03 Eastern Counties Football League season was the 61st in the history of Eastern Counties Football League a football competition in England.

Premier Division

The Premier Division featured 20 clubs which competed in the division last season, along with three new clubs:
Histon reserves, promoted from Division One
Norwich United, promoted from Division One
Wisbech Town, relegated from the Southern League

League table

Division One

Division One featured 15 clubs which competed in the division last season, along with four new clubs:
Felixstowe & Walton United, relegated from the Premier Division
Godmanchester Rovers, joined from the Cambridgeshire League
Long Melford, joined from the Essex and Suffolk Border League
Swaffham Town, relegated from the Premier Division

League table

References

External links
 Eastern Counties Football League

2002-03
2002–03 in English football leagues